Víctor Fernández was an Argentine equestrian. He competed in two events at the 1928 Summer Olympics.

References

Year of birth missing
Year of death missing
Argentine male equestrians
Olympic equestrians of Argentina
Equestrians at the 1928 Summer Olympics
Place of birth missing